Marlo Meekins is an American cartoonist, comedian, caricaturist, model and actress. She is best known for her work on Vine.

Biography
Meekins was born in Collingswood, New Jersey. In 2003, she earned a bachelor's degree in Illustration from Moore College of Art and Design. She also attended the Rhode Island School of Design.

Meekins' work came to notice when she started a blog in 2005 and was featured in Zoo Weekly Australia and Attack of the Show!, who praised her "Ren & Stimpy-style illustrations." She won the Silver Nosey Award for Caricaturist of the Year at the 2009 International Society of Caricature Artists convention.

Meekins' Vine videos often feature crude humor and satire and make use of animation, costumes, props, fake blood, special effects, and her dogs. They earned her a place on Comedy Central's first online comedy festival in 2013, where The New York Times praised her "crisp ideas and unexpected visual flourishes". Later that year, Meekins was commissioned by Wendy's to make and share a Vine in her typical style.

She is married to cartoonist Nick Cross.

References

External links
 
 

American women cartoonists
Vine (service) celebrities
1980s births
Living people
People from Collingswood, New Jersey
Artists from New Jersey
Moore College of Art and Design alumni
Rhode Island School of Design alumni
American cartoonists
21st-century American women